Kidal (Tuareg Berber: ⴾⴸⵍ, KDL, Kidal) is a town and commune in the desert region of northern Mali.

History
On 30 March 2012, Kidal and its military base were captured by the National Movement for the Liberation of Azawad as part of the Tuareg rebellion for the independence of Azawad. A spokesman for the Malian military junta said "To preserve the life of the people of Kidal, the military command decided not to prolong the battle". Gao and Timbuktu were captured within the next 48 hours, and on 6 April, the National Movement for the Liberation of Azawad declared the independence of Azawad from Mali. In the course of the conflict the MNLA lost their control to Islamist militias. On 30 January 2013 French and Malian forces moved into the town to bring it back under government control.

On 14 December 2013, a car bombing in Kidal killed two United Nations peacekeepers.

On 21 May 2014, MNLA forced government troops in Kidal to retreat after heavy fighting, capturing the military base.

On 13 February 2020 Mali government forces returned to Kidal after six years.

Demographics

Historical population

The population of the city of Kidal has grown from 11,159 in 1998 to 25,969 in 2009, raising its percentage in the Kidal Region from 26.3% to 38.3%.

Languages

Kidal city is mainly Tamasheq speaking with 79.13% of the city speaking it in 2009. The second most spoken language in Kidal city is Songhai with 7.18% of the city speaking it. Other minority languages include Bambara spoken by 5.51% of the city, Arabic spoken by 3.78% of the city, and other minority languages spoken by 4.4%.

Notable Inhabitants
Musician Ahmed Ag Kaedy comes originally from Kidal.

Climate
Köppen-Geiger climate classification system classifies it climate as hot desert (BWh), with extremely hot weather most of the year.

Gallery

References

External links
.
.

Populated places in Kidal Region
Regional capitals in Mali
Tuareg
Azawad
Berber populated places